Frank Michael Spinath (born 1969) is a German psychologist and musician. He is a professor of psychology at Saarland University, known for his research in the field of differential psychology. As a musician, he is known as the vocalist of the electronic duo Seabound and the German futurepop band Edge of Dawn.

Education and academic career
Born in Wipperfürth, Germany, Spinath earned his diploma, Ph.D., and habilitation degrees in psychology from the University of Bielefeld in 1995, 1999, and 2003, respectively. He became a full professor of psychology at Saarland University in 2004.

Musical career
Spinath was introduced to fellow German Martin Vorbrodt in 1995 by a mutual friend; the two soon began collaborating. The duo perform and record as Seabound. After signing with Dependent Records, Seabound released their debut album No Sleep Demon in 2001.

References

External links

Faculty page

Seabound Home Page
Edge of Dawn Home Page

Living people
German electronic musicians
German psychologists
Academic staff of Saarland University
Bielefeld University alumni
1969 births
People from Wipperfürth
Differential psychologists